Takhtgah or Takhtegah may refer to:
Takhtgah-e Hoseyn Soltan
Takhtgah-e Jahan Bakhsh
Takhtgah-e Safi Yar Soltan
Takhtgah-e Surat Khanom

See also
Sar Takhtgah